Johann Heinrich Höfer (22 October 1825, Eisfeld - 10 February 1878, Munich) was a German landscape and portrait painter.

Biography 

He was born to a respected family of weavers, who had become poor due to the mechanization of the textile industry. When he was fourteen, his father died and he was forced to earn his own living. He had some talent for drawing, so he was able to find a position as a porcelain painter. At the age of twenty-two, inspired to seek a career in art, he went to Prague to become a portrait painter. He had little success, and returned after two years.

He set off again in 1851, travelling through Dresden, Prague and Linz, to Styria, where he planned to become a landscape painter. This time, he was more successful. By 1855, he could afford to settle in Munich and join the Kunstverein (Artists' Association). There, he soon learned that being self-taught was not enough. Through some friends he was introduced to Eduard Schleich, who assisted him, and he was able to make copies of the old Dutch Masters at the Alte Pinakothek. He also decided to make a systematic study of nature, and made several painting expeditions every year, that took him throughout Bavaria, Tyrolia, and Switzerland. The Chiemsee and the Fraueninsel were among his favorite locations. 

In 1867 he married Mathilde Nenninger, a doctor's daughter from his hometown. They had two sons; Wilhelm, who also became a doctor, and Adolf, who took after his father and became a landscape painter. He acquired a three-story house on the Gabelsbergerstraße, with six studio spaces in the back.

Mathilde died of tuberculosis in 1873. The following year he married the widow, Amalie Ruhwandl, who was also a doctor's daughter. Höfer himself died of tuberculosis in 1878, shprtly after taking a long-awaited trip to Italy. Amalie's two children from her first marriage had both died as infants, so she raised Wilhelm and Adolf. She would outlive Höfer by almost forty years, dying in 1917.

His works may be seen at the Munich Stadtmuseum, the Staatliche Graphische Sammlung, and the Braith-Mali-Museum, among others.

References

Further reading 
 "Nekrolog – Heinrich Höfer", In: Bericht über den Bestand und das Wirken des Kunstvereins in München während des Jahres 1878, Kunstverein München, 1879, pp.68–69
 "Höfer, Heinrich". In: Friedrich von Boetticher: Malerwerke des 19. Jahrhunderts. Beitrag zur Kunstgeschichte,. Vols.1/2, Heideck–Mayer,  Dresden 1895, pg.549 (Online)
 Horst Ludwig: "Heinrich Höfer", In: Bruckmanns Lexikon der Münchner Kunst. Münchner Maler des 19. Jahrhunderts, Vol.2: Gebhardt–Kustner. Bruckmann Verlag, 1982, pg.208
 Heiko Haine (Ed.), "Heinrich Höfer. Ein Münchner Maler aus Eisfeld. Werkverzeichnis", In: Schriften und Kataloge des Museums Eisfeld, Vol.2, Museum Eisfeld, 2014,

External links 

 More works by Höfer @ ArtNet

1825 births
1878 deaths
German painters
German landscape painters
Self-taught artists
19th-century deaths from tuberculosis
People from Hildburghausen (district)
Tuberculosis deaths in Germany